The 1907 Georgetown Blue and Gray football team represented Georgetown University during the 1907 college football season. Led by Joe Reilly in his fourth year as head coach, the team went 3–3–1.

Schedule

References

Georgetown
Georgetown Hoyas football seasons
Georgetown Blue and Gray football